Mariely Sánchez Hichez (born December 30, 1988) is a Dominican Republic sprinter from Santo Domingo. She won a bronze medal in the 200 meters at the 2011 Pan American Games. At the 2012 Summer Olympics, Sánchez also competed in the Women's 200 meters.

Sánchez holds the 100 meters Dominican record.

International competitions

Personal bests
 100 meters – 11.24 (+0.1 m/s, Morelia 2013) 
 200 meters – 23.01 (+1.6 m/s, Edmonton 2013)

References

External links
 

Living people
1988 births
Dominican Republic female sprinters
Olympic athletes of the Dominican Republic
Athletes (track and field) at the 2008 Summer Olympics
Athletes (track and field) at the 2012 Summer Olympics
Athletes (track and field) at the 2016 Summer Olympics
Pan American Games medalists in athletics (track and field)
Athletes (track and field) at the 2011 Pan American Games
Athletes (track and field) at the 2019 Pan American Games
World Athletics Championships athletes for the Dominican Republic
Pan American Games bronze medalists for the Dominican Republic
Central American and Caribbean Games bronze medalists for the Dominican Republic
Competitors at the 2010 Central American and Caribbean Games
Competitors at the 2018 Central American and Caribbean Games
Central American and Caribbean Games medalists in athletics
Medalists at the 2011 Pan American Games
Olympic female sprinters
20th-century Dominican Republic women
21st-century Dominican Republic women